The Stargate YT-33 is an American homebuilt aircraft that was designed and intended to be produced by Stargate, Inc of McMinnville, Oregon, introduced in 1994. The aircraft is a 2/3 scale replica of the Lockheed T-33 jet trainer.

Listed as "under development" in 1998, the YT-33 was planned to be supplied as a kit for amateur construction, but it is unlikely any kits were ever shipped.

Design and development
The YT-33 features a cantilever low-wing, a two-seats-in-tandem enclosed cockpit under a bubble canopy, retractable tricycle landing gear and a single jet engine.

The aircraft is made from composite material. The prototype uses a  thrust Turbomeca Marboré IIC jet powerplant.

The manufacturer estimated the construction time from the proposed kit to be 3000 hours.

Operational history
By 1998 the company reported that one aircraft had been completed and was flying.

On 18 April 2018 the one example that had been registered in the United States with the Federal Aviation Administration was de-registered and the aircraft may not exist any more.

Specifications (YT-33)

References

External links
Video of the aircraft

YT-33
1990s United States sport aircraft
Low-wing aircraft
Homebuilt aircraft
Replica aircraft
Single-engined jet aircraft